The Bornean blue flycatcher (Cyornis superbus) is a species of bird in the family Muscicapidae. It is found in Brunei, Indonesia, and Malaysia, where it is endemic to the island of Borneo. Its natural habitat is subtropical or tropical moist montane forests.

References

 BirdLife International 2011. .

Cyornis
Endemic birds of Borneo
Birds described in 1925
Taxonomy articles created by Polbot